Sergio Campana (born 5 June 1986 in Reggio Emilia) is an Italian racing driver. He has competed in such series as Eurocup Formula Renault 2.0 and the Italian Formula Three Championship.

Racing record

Complete Auto GP results
(key)

Complete GP2 Series results
(key) (Races in bold indicate pole position) (Races in italics indicate fastest lap)

Complete Formula Acceleration 1 results
(key) (Races in bold indicate pole position) (Races in italics indicate fastest lap)

Complete European Le Mans Series results
(key) (Races in bold indicate pole position; results in italics indicate fastest lap)

References

External links
 
 

1986 births
Living people
Sportspeople from Reggio Emilia
Italian racing drivers
Formula Renault Eurocup drivers
Italian Formula Renault 2.0 drivers
Portuguese Formula Renault 2.0 drivers
Italian Formula Three Championship drivers
Auto GP drivers
GP2 Series drivers
Prema Powerteam drivers
Karting World Championship drivers
European Le Mans Series drivers
Trident Racing drivers
Team Lazarus drivers
Euronova Racing drivers
BVM Target drivers
Cram Competition drivers